Dactyladenia eketensis is a species of plant in the family Chrysobalanaceae. It is endemic to Nigeria.  It is threatened by habitat loss.

References

eketensis
Critically endangered plants
Endemic flora of Nigeria
Taxonomy articles created by Polbot
Taxa named by Émile Auguste Joseph De Wildeman